Bernard Grant (October 10, 1920 – June 30, 2004) was an American actor.

Grant was born in New York City, New York, in  The Bronx. He served in the United States Army during World War II. Grant also went to the City College of New York. Active in soap operas such as The Guiding Light and One Life to Live, he was the regular English voice of  Marcello Mastroianni and Gian Maria Volonté (dubbing over him in A Fistful of Dollars, For a Few Dollars More, Bandits in Milan and A Bullet for the General). He also dubbed Captain Clinton (Aldo Giuffré) in The Good, the Bad and the Ugly and Valmont (Adolfo Celi) in Danger: Diabolik.

References

External links

1920 births
2004 deaths
People from the Bronx
Male actors from New York City
Military personnel from New York City
City College of New York alumni
20th-century American male actors
21st-century American male actors
United States Army personnel of World War II